Armina neapolitana is a species of sea slug, a nudibranch, a marine gastropod mollusk in the family Arminidae.

Distribution
This species occurs in European waters and in the Mediterranean Sea.

References

 Gofas, S.; Le Renard, J.; Bouchet, P. (2001). Mollusca, in: Costello, M.J. et al. (Ed.) (2001). European register of marine species: a check-list of the marine species in Europe and a bibliography of guides to their identification. Collection Patrimoines Naturels, 50: pp. 180–213

Arminidae
Gastropods described in 1824
Taxa named by Stefano delle Chiaje